The Canadian Motorcycle Association (CMA; , ACM) was founded in 1946. In 1950, it became affiliated with the World Governing Body of the Federation Internationale de Motocyclisme.

Federally incorporated in 1957, it serves as a national voice for Canadian motorcycle riders and enthusiasts. The CMA is headquartered in Hamilton, Ontario, Canada.

External links
 CMA on the internet

Motorcyclists organizations
National members of the FIM
Sports governing bodies in Canada
Motorcycle clubs in Canada